Poetics: Journal of Empirical Research on Culture, the Media and the Arts is a bimonthly peer-reviewed academic journal covering the field of poetics and the empirical study of literature. The editors-in-chief are Patricia A. Banks, Frédéric C. Godart, and Tally Katz-Gerro. It is published by Elsevier and was established in 1971. According to Poetics' official website, the journal has a 2021 impact factor of 1.857.

References

External links

Elsevier academic journals
Bimonthly journals
Publications established in 1971
English-language journals
Literary magazines published in the Netherlands
Magazines published in Amsterdam